The United States Military Academy (USMA) is an undergraduate college in West Point, New York that educates and commissions officers for the United States Army. Confederate President Jefferson Davis, himself a former officer and West Point graduate (class of 1828), preferred West Point trained officers for the Confederate States Army (CSA). This article lists those alumni. Also included are a number of officers who were cadets at West Point but for reason known or unknown never graduated, such as Lewis Armistead. There are several (indicated) familial relations between the officers, e.g. between members of the Lee family of Virginia. Other notable Confederate officers include James Longstreet (class of 1842), Stonewall Jackson (class of 1846), and J.E.B. Stuart (class of 1854).



List
Note: "Class year" refers to the class year of the individual alumnus, which usually is the same year he graduated. In times of war classes often graduate early.
Note: A "-" before a class year in brackets means that the individual alumnus was part of this class, but did not graduate.
Note: Alumni who graduated in the same class are listed according to class rank, highest to lowest, with non-graduates listed alphabetically at the end.

See also
List of Union Army officers educated at the United States Military Academy

References
General

Inline citations

West Point
Academy alumni, famous list

C
Alu
Civ